Alba Fehérvár are a Hungarian professional basketball club based in Székesfehérvár that compete Nemzeti Bajnokság I, the premier division of basketball in Hungary. Founded as the successor of Székesfehérvári MDSE, they took the Hungarian championship title five times and won the Hungarian cup on four occasions. In addition, Albacomp also were crowned as the Central European Basketball League champions in 2009.

Players

Retired numbers

Current roster

Depth chart

Honours

Domestic competitions
Nemzeti Bajnokság I/A (National Championship of Hungary)
 Champions (5): 1997–98, 1998–99, 1999–00, 2012–13, 2016–17
 Runners-up (3): 2005–06, 2010–11, 2015–16
 Third place (5): 1995–96, 2003–04, 2004–05, 2007–08, 2011–12, 2017-18

Magyar Kupa (National Cup of Hungary)
 Winners (4): 1999, 1990, 2013, 2017
 Runners-up (3): 2004, 2005, 2011

European competitions
Central European Basketball League (1):
 2009

Season by season

 Cancelled due to the COVID-19 pandemic in Hungary.

Sponsorship

Notable players

Hungarians

  Kornél Dávid
  Ádám Hanga
  Márton Báder
  Péter Lóránt
  Dávid Vojvoda

Foreigners

  Justin Edwards
  Alhaji Mohammed 
  Velibor Radović
  Lance Blanks
  Ronnie McMahan
  George Banks
  Tony Crocker
  Lasan Kromah 
  Damian Hollis 
  Jarrod Jones 
  Ronald Moore 
  Brandon Wood 
  James Farr 
  Winston Shepard 
  Brandon Taylor 
  Maurice Kemp

Head coaches
  Sándor Farkas
  Imre Vetési
  Branislav Dzunić
  Jesus Ramirez

References

External links
 Official website 

Basketball teams in Hungary
Basketball teams established in 1949
1949 establishments in Hungary